The 1997 ITU Triathlon World Championships was a triathlon event held in Perth, Western Australia on 16 November 1997, organised by the International Triathlon Union. The championship was won by Australians Chris McCormack and Emma Carney. The course was a  swim,  bike,  run.

Results

Men's Championship

Women's Championship

Junior men

Junior women

References

World Triathlon Series
World Championships
Sports competitions in Perth, Western Australia
International sports competitions hosted by Australia
Triathlon competitions in Australia
1997 in Australian sport
November 1997 sports events in Australia
1990s in Perth, Western Australia